Steven Kevin Connor, FBA (born 11 February 1955) is a British literary scholar. Since 2012, he has been the Grace 2 Professor of English in the University of Cambridge and a Fellow of Peterhouse, Cambridge. He was formerly the academic director of the London Consortium and professor of modern literature and theory at Birkbeck, University of London.

Early life and education
Connor was born on 11 February 1955 in Chichester or Bognor Regis, both in Sussex, England. From 1966 to 1972, he was educated at Christ's Hospital, then an all-boys private school in Horsham, Sussex. Having been expelled from Christ's Hospital, he attended Bognor Regis School, a comprehensive school in Bognor Regis. In 1973, he matriculated into Wadham College, Oxford to study English; his tutor was Terry Eagleton. He graduated with a first class Bachelor of Arts (BA) degree in 1976. He remained at Oxford to study for a Doctor of Philosophy (DPhil) degree in English. He completed his doctorate in 1980 with a thesis titled "Prose fantasy and myth-criticism 1880–1900".

Academic career
In 1979 or 1980, Connor joined Birkbeck College, University of London, as a lecturer in English. He was promoted to senior lecturer in 1990, made Reader in Modern English Literature in 1991, and appointed Professor of Modern Literature and Theory in 1994. He held two senior positions at the college: he was Pro-Vice-Master for International and Research Students between 1998 and 2001; and College Orator between 2001 and 2012. From 2002 to 2012, he additionally served as Academic Director of the London Consortium, a graduate school of the University of London that specialised multidisciplinary programs.

In October 2012, Connor was appointed the Grace 2 Professor of English in the Faculty of English, University of Cambridge. He was also elected a Fellow of Peterhouse, Cambridge.

Personal life
In 1984, Connor married Lindsey Richardson. Together they had one daughter. They divorced in 1988. In 2005, Connor married Lynda Nead. Together they have two sons. Nead is an art historian and academic.

Honours
In 2012, Connor was elected an Honorary Fellow of Birkbeck, University of London. In July 2016, he was elected a Fellow of the British Academy (FBA), the United Kingdom's national academy for the humanities and social sciences.

Selected works

Books
 Charles Dickens (Oxford: Basil Blackwell, 1985)
 Samuel Beckett: Repetition, Theory and Text (Oxford: Basil Blackwell, 1988)
 Postmodernist Culture: An Introduction to Theories of the Contemporary (1989) 2nd, revised and enlarged edn (Oxford: Blackwell, 1996)
 Theory and Cultural Value (1992)
 The English Novel in History 1950–1995 (1995)
 James Joyce (Exeter: Northcote House, 1996)
 Dumbstruck – A Cultural History of Ventriloquism (2000)
 The Book of Skin (2003)
 Fly (London: Reaktion, 2006)
 The Matter of Air: Science and Art of the Ethereal (London: Reaktion, 2010)
 (ed.) Samuel Beckett: The Unnamable (London: Faber, 2010)
 Paraphernalia: The Curious Lives of Magical Things (London: Profile, 2011)
 A Philosophy of Sport (London: Reaktion, 2011)
 Beyond Words: Sobs, Hums, Stutters and Other Vocalizations (London: Reaktion, 2014)
 Beckett, Modernism and the Material Imagination (Cambridge: Cambridge University Press, 2014)
 Living By Numbers: In Defence of Quantity (London: Reaktion, 2016)
 Dream Machines (London: Open Humanities Press, 2017)
 The Madness of Knowledge: On Wisdom, Ignorance and Fantasies of Knowing (London: Reaktion, 2019)
 Giving Way: Thoughts on Unappreciated Dispositions (Stanford: Stanford University Press, 2019)

Articles
 'Next to Nothing', Tate Etc., 12 (2008): 82–93.
 'The Shakes: Conditions of Tremor', The Senses and Society, 3 (2008): 205–20.
 ‘On Such and Such a Day…In Such a World': Beckett’s Radical Finitude. In Borderless Beckett/Beckett sans frontières, Samuel Beckett Today/Aujourd’hui, 19 (2008): 35–50.
 ‘Le Voci Dentro e Fuori di Noi’, (interview with Enzo Mansueto), Rodeo, 43 (2008): 66.
 'The Right Stuff', Modern Painters (March 2009): 58–63.
 'Strings in the Earth and Air', New Formations (Special Issue on Postmodernism, Music and Cultural Theory, ed. David Bennett ), 66 (2009), 58–67.
 'Pulverulence', Cabinet, 35 (2009): 71–77.
 'Absolute Levity', Comparative Critical Studies, 6 (2009): 411–27.

References

External links
Official web site

Living people
1955 births
British literary historians
Fellows of Peterhouse, Cambridge
Academics of Birkbeck, University of London
Alumni of Wadham College, Oxford
People from Chichester
People from Bognor Regis
People educated at Christ's Hospital
Philosophers of sport